The Child and the Tramp is a 1911 silent film  short directed by Bannister Merwin. It was produced by the Edison Manufacturing Company.

Cast
Charles M. Seay as Reckless, 1st tramp
William West as 2nd tramp
John R. Cumpson as 3rd tramp
Harold M. Shaw as The Child's Father
Miriam Nesbitt as The Child's Mother
Edna May Weick as The Child

References

External links
 The Child and the Tramp at IMDb.com

1911 films
American silent short films
1911 short films
Edison Manufacturing Company films
American black-and-white films
1910s American films